The 2008 Missouri Republican presidential primary on February 5, 2008 determined the recipient of 55 of the state's 58 delegates to the Republican National Convention in the process to elect the 44th President of the United States. It was an open primary.  John McCain won a slight plurality of the vote, receiving all of Missouri's delegates.

Results

*Candidate dropped out prior to primary

Opinion polling

Please see the following article for opinion polling: Statewide opinion polling for the 2008 Republican Party presidential primaries

County by county results

See also
 2008 Missouri Democratic presidential primary
 2008 Republican Party presidential primaries

References

Missouri
Republican primary
2008
2008 Super Tuesday